Traveling Hopefully is a 1982 American short documentary film directed by John G. Avildsen. It was nominated for an Academy Award for Best Documentary Short.  It focuses on Roger Nash Baldwin, founder of the American Civil Liberties Union. Baldwin tells of how he got interested in civil liberties, and mentions a number of the cases in which the ACLU defended people or entities.

Reaction
Janet Maslin of The New York Times wrote "This is an amiable, well-intentioned documentary, but an extremely superficial one". Also writing in the Times, John J. O'Connor stated that Traveling Hopefully "captures, with warmth, the admirable grittiness of an American original".

References

External links
Traveling Hopefully at  "The Reel Mudd" the audiovisual blog of the Seeley G. Mudd Manuscript Library, Princeton University

, posted by Princeton University

1982 films
1982 short films
1982 documentary films
1980s short documentary films
1982 independent films
American short documentary films
American independent films
Films directed by John G. Avildsen
Films scored by Bill Conti
1980s English-language films
1980s American films